Division Street Historic District may refer to:

Division Street Historic District (Bridgeport, Connecticut), listed on the National Register of Historic Places in Fairfield County, Connecticut
Division Street Historic District (Platteville, Wisconsin), listed on the National Register of Historic Places in Grant County, Wisconsin